Isaac Honey (born June 6, 1993, in Kumasi) is a Ghanaian footballer who is currently playing in the Thai League for Police Tero.

Career 
Honey joined in the Spring of 2012 to Thailand and signed with BEC Tero Sasana, which loaned him for the 2013 season to League rival Samut Songkhram F.C. He played the 2013 season with Samut Songkhram and returned to BEC Tero Sasana F.C., which loaned him now for the remainder 2014 season to Air Force AVIA F.C.

Notes

External links
 

1994 births
Living people
Ghanaian footballers
Association football central defenders
Issac Honey
Issac Honey
Issac Honey
Issac Honey
Issac Honey
Ghanaian expatriate footballers
Ghanaian expatriate sportspeople in Thailand
Expatriate footballers in Thailand
Footballers from Kumasi